Michael Sacks (born September 11, 1948 in New York City) is an American actor and technology industry executive who played the role of Billy Pilgrim in George Roy Hill's Slaughterhouse Five (1972).

Biography
Sacks has a Bachelor of Arts in Social Relations from Harvard College and a Master of Science in Computer Science from Columbia University.

Sacks played the role of Billy Pilgrim in George Roy Hill's Slaughterhouse Five (1972), an adaptation from the novel by Kurt Vonnegut.

Sacks also appeared in Steven Spielberg's Sugarland Express (1974), as the kidnapped highway patrolman; The Private Files of J. Edgar Hoover (1977), as Melvin Purvis; The Amityville Horror (1979), as Jeff; Hanover Street (1979), with Harrison Ford; the thriller Split Image (1982); and the television disaster film Starflight: The Plane That Couldn't Land (1983). On Broadway, he was the bewildered Vietnam vet "Mark" in Kennedy's Children by Robert Patrick. He retired from the entertainment industry in 1984; his last role was in the black comedy film The House of God, with Tim Matheson.

After spending time working in technology positions on Wall Street, Sacks in 2004 joined the online bond trading company, MarketAxess, as head of global applications development. He was employed by Morgan Stanley from 1994 to 2004, as executive director, global head of bond technology for the fixed income division. Other assignments at Morgan Stanley included chief operating officer for fixed income technology and global head of technology for the foreign exchange division. Prior to Morgan Stanley he held positions at Salomon Brothers, Inc. and IBM Research Division.

Filmography

References

External links
 

1948 births
Living people
American male film actors
American male television actors
Male actors from New York City
Harvard College alumni
Columbia University alumni
American chief operating officers